The North Platte U.S. Post Office and Federal Building is a historic three-story building in North Platte, Nebraska. It was built in 1913, and designed in the Renaissance Revival style by architect James Knox Taylor.  Its front facade has a central entrance under a brick segmented arch.

The post office was relocated in 1964 when a new Federal building was constructed, and the building was then to be used by a community college. It has been listed on the National Register of Historic Places since March 4, 2009.

References

Federal buildings in the United States
National Register of Historic Places in Lincoln County, Nebraska
Post office buildings on the National Register of Historic Places in Nebraska
Renaissance Revival architecture in Nebraska
Government buildings completed in 1913
1913 establishments in Nebraska